Goddard may refer to:

People 
 Goddard (given name)
 Goddard (surname)

Places in the United States
Goddard, Kansas
Goddard, Kentucky
Goddard, Maryland
Goddard College, a low-residency college with campuses in Vermont and Washington 
Goddard Memorial State Park, Warwick, Rhode Island 
Homer, Indiana, also known as Goddard
Maurice K. Goddard State Park, New Vernon Township, Pennsylvania

Named after Robert H. Goddard
 Goddard (crater), a lunar crater along the eastern limb of the Moon
 Goddard High Resolution Spectrograph, a spectrograph installed on the Hubble Space Telescope
 Goddard High School (New Mexico), Roswell, New Mexico
 Goddard Space Flight Center, a major NASA space science laboratory in Greenbelt, Maryland
 Goddard Institute for Space Studies, component laboratory of Goddard Space Flight Center
 Blue Origin Goddard, a private spacecraft which first flew in November 2006
 Version 13 of the popular Linux distribution Fedora, nicknamed Goddard
 Goddard, a robotic dog in the American animated television series The Adventures of Jimmy Neutron: Boy Genius

Other uses
 Goddard & Gibbs, stained glass manufacturers
 Goddard School, a national network of franchised, early childhood education providers

See also 
 Goddard–Thorn theorem, a mathematical theorem about certain vector spaces
 Maine penny, also known as the "Goddard coin"
 Godard (disambiguation)